Armoured catfish may refer to:

Family Loricariidae: The armoured suckermouth catfish, also known as suckermouth catfish, armoured catfish or simply 'plecs' or 'plecos'
Family Callichthyidae: armoured catfish, includes the genera
Corydoras, sometimes referred to as armoured catfish
Callichthys, known as the armoured catfish
Hoplosternum, known as the brown hoplo, cascadura or armoured catfish and in Guyana it's called Hassa.
Callichthys callichthys, a species popular in the aquarium trade, common name 'armoured catfish'
The thorny catfishes, Doradidae, are also sometimes referred to as armoured catfish

Armored catfish
Fish common names